The Compass Rose Benefits Group is an insurance provider that offers health insurance plans for civilian employees and retirees of the United States Intelligence Community, United States Department of Defense and the United States Department of State, as well as a range of other insurance products for all employees and retirees of the Federal Government. Their additional insurance is available to all Federal Government employees.

History
In 1948, an organization known as the Government Employees Health Association (GEHA) allowed a small section of Federal Government employees to obtain group health insurance plans. Since that time, a number of insurance plans have been added or changed.

In 1960, the newly established Federal Employees Health Benefits (FEHB) Act of 1959 provided all Federal employees, annuitants, and eligible family members with the opportunity to voluntarily enroll in a group health benefits program with the government sharing the cost of participation. GEHA qualified under this Act and quickly entered into the FEHB program. Due to name similarities with another insurance carrier, GEHA changed its health plan name to the Association Benefit Plan (ABP).

For over 55 years, the Association Benefit Plan was underwritten by Mutual of Omaha. In 2006, the company name was changed to Compass Rose Benefits Group (CRBG) and eligibility was extended to include all employees of the Intelligence Community (IC). In 2007, Coventry Health Care became the health plan underwriter. In 2008, CRBG extended eligibility to include civilian employees and retirees of the Department of Defense (DoD). In 2011, eligibility expanded once again to include employees of the Department of State and the U.S. Agency for International Development and the network provider changed to UnitedHealthcare  (UHC), which is one of the largest network providers and facilities in the FEHB market. In 2015, eligibility on insurance (aside from the health plan) opened to include all employees of the Federal Government.

Evolution of company name
 1948: Government Employees Health Association (GEHA)
 2006: Compass Rose Benefits Group (CRBG)

Evolution of health plan name
 1948: Government Employees Health Association (GEHA)
 1960: Association Benefit Plan 
 2011: Compass Rose Health Plan

Evolution of underwriter
 1948: Mutual of Omaha
 2007: Coventry Health Care
 2011: UnitedHealth

Insurance
Compass Rose Benefits Group insurance includes:
 The Compass Rose Health Plan, an FEHB Plan
 Group term life insurance underwritten by New York Life
 Group accident plan 
 Legal protection (liability insurance)
 Identity theft protection

References

Insurance companies of the United States
Financial services companies established in 2006
Companies based in Reston, Virginia